Bindass is an Indian Hindi language Music pay television channel owned by Disney Star. Originally launched as a youth channel, it now serves as a more dedicated music channel.

History
UTV Software Communications launched Bindass as a youth-oriented entertainment channel on 24 September 2007 along with movie channel Bindass Movies (which was later rebranded as UTV Action). Initial programming consisted of a sitcoms Sun Yaar Chill Maar and Lagegi, action series Shakira - The End of Evil, 3rd Degree with Ugesh Sarcar and six international shows The Benny Hill Show, Japanese Pro Wrestling Show, Gotcha, Motorrad Cops, Whacked Out Sports and Challenges of Fire.

In February 2010, Bindass launched a new campaign titled "What I Am" which aimed at speaking for the youth of India, and dispel popular misconceptions about their attitude towards responsibilities.

The Walt Disney Company acquired UTV in 2012 and Bindass along with other UTV channels became part of Disney India Media Networks.

The channel launched Halla Bol in 2014, first show under the new brand campaign. The show showcased stories inspired by various real life instances and celebrates the victories of women who stood their ground to emerge as heroes. The show was hosted by television actor Karan Tacker.

In 2016 Disney Media Networks India started producing Web television series which will be simulcast on Bindass as well digital platforms like Facebook and YouTube. The first series  under this multi-platform strategy was  The Girl in the City which was followed by The Trip, Girl in the City Chapter 2, Dil Buffering and Tere Liye Bro.

In 2017 Disney India closed Bindass Play, a music channel and its content was merged with Bindass.

In October 2021, it was reported that Bindass would be shut down on 30 November 2021.  However, the shutdown was later cancelled.

Bindass India concert
On 13 January 2008, Bindass presented a two-hour live concert starring popular Bollywood star Shahrukh Khan at MMRDA Grounds, Mumbai. The entourage included stars Priyanka Chopra, Dia Mirza, Rakhi Sawant and Dino Morea. The concert was hosted by Sajid Khan, and choreographed by Ganesh Hegde.

Prior to the contest Bindass organized a nationwide contest called "Dance with SRK", where the lucky winners would get to dance with Shah Rukh Khan on stage. Through a lucky dip, three winners, Andrew from Kolkatta, Richa from Lucknow and 9 year old Vidhi from Mumbai, were chosen. The concert was telecast on Bindass on 26 January 2008 on Indian Republic Day.

Programming

 3rd Degree with Ugesh Sarcar (2007–2009)
 Beg Borrow Steal (2011–2017)
 The Benny Hill Show (2007–2008)
 Big Switch (2009–2015)
 Cash Cab-Meter Chalu Hai (2008–2010)
 The Chair (2010)
 Challenges of Fire (2007–2008)
 Change Aaeyga Hum Laayenge (2014)
 Dadagiri (2008–2011)
 Destination Love (2010)
 Dil Buffering (2017)
 Emotional Atyachar (2009–2015)
 Fear Less (2012)
 Halla Bol (2015)
 Hass Ley India (2007–2008)
 Girl in the City (2016)
 Girl in the City: Chapter 2 (2017)
 Girl in the City: Chapter 3 (2018)
 Ishq Messenger (2017–2021)
 Japanese Wrestling Show (2007–2008)
 The Khan Sisters (2011–2013)
 Kiss Kiss Bang Bang (2008)
 Kota Toppers (2015–2016)
 Lagegi (2007)
 Life Lafde Aur Bandiyan (2016)
 Live out Loud – It’s Now or Never (2012)
 Love by Chance (2014–2015)
 Love Lock Up (2011)
 Meri Toh Lag Gayi.... Naukri (2011)
 Motorrad Cops (2007–2008)
 Pyar Ka The End (2014)
 Road Diaries (2016)
 Selfie Wala Show (2017–2021)
 Shakira - The End of Evil (2007–2008)
 Sun Yaar Chill Maar (2007–2008)
 Sun Yaar Try Maar (2015)
 Surprise Surprise Gotcha (2007–2008)
 Superdude (2011–2013)
 Tere Liye Bro (2017–2018)
 Tia's Request Show  (2017–2021)
 The Trip (2016–2018)
 Tu Con Main Con (2015)
 Whacked Out Sports (2007–2008)
 Yeh Hai Aashiqui (2013–2016)
 Zabaan Sambhalke (2007–2008)
 Zindagi Wins (2015)

References

External links
Official website

Television stations in Mumbai
Hindi-language television channels in India
Television channels and stations established in 2007
UTV Software Communications
Disney India Media Networks
Bindass original programming
Disney Star
Music television channels in India